Anoor Anantha Krishna Sharma (born 1965) is a mridangist from India.

Early life and background
Anoor Anantha Krishna Sharma (popularly known as Shivu) who hails from a family of musicians was born to Vidwan Anoor R Ramakrishna and Smt. Sree Lakshmi. His father Anoor Ramakrishna was a violinist, and a teacher in the Dept. of Music of Bangalore University.

Career
As an artist, Anantha Krishna Sharma started performing professionally at the age of fifteen. He has accompanied many artistes such as Gayathri Venkata Raghavan, T. M. Krishna, H S Prashanth, Sriram Parasuram, Charulatha Ramanujam, M.S. Sheela, T. S. Satyavathi, Jayanthi Kumaresh and C. Honnappa Bhagavathar and others.

Anantha Krishna Sharma has travelled across the globe as an accompanying artiste and for conducting workshops. few notable performances:
 AKKA conference, USA 
 Group Jugalbandi with Pranesh and Praveen Gotkhindi called "Ganga Kaveri", USA.
 Played Mridangam for Raghu Dixit Productions 
 Composed rhythmic patterns for an ensemble of Sri Ayyanar College of Music, "LayaLahari".
 Composed and directed a "Folk Ensemble" containing only folk instruments with varied folk patterns knit together.
 Composed music for Sanskrit Verses on Hindu GOD's. Produced & Released by   "Roots Music" for 53 albums.
 Composed music for a traditional Kathak performance by Nirupama and Rajendra
 Composed and directed a unique rhythmic programme in which utensils from kitchen, furniture and miscellaneous items found at home were used to create a percussion ensemble.

Recognition

 "Best Mridangam Artist" in 1981 by Gayana Samaja
 "Laya Kala Prathibhamani" Title and Vidwan H. Puttachar Memorial award by Percussive Arts Centre in 2000
 "Best Mridangam Artist" in 1996 from Madras Music Academy
 "Ganakala Shri" in 2005 by Karnataka Ganakala Parishat
 Felicitated by "Hamsadhwani Creations" in 2009
 "Asthana Vidwan" of Sri Kanchi Mutt in 2010 by Sri Kanchi Mutt

Disciples
Anoor Anantha Krishna Sharma has trained percussion artistes like Arun Kumar, G. Guruprasanna.

References

External links

1965 births
Living people
Musicians from Bangalore
Indian percussionists
Mridangam players
20th-century Indian musicians
20th-century drummers